The Texas Cowboy Monument is an outdoor memorial commemorating Texas' cowboys, installed on the Texas State Capitol grounds in Austin, Texas, United States. The monument was sculpted by Constance Whitney Warren and erected in 1925. It features a bronze statue of a cowboy on a rearing horse atop a concrete base.

See also

 1925 in art

References

External links
 

1925 establishments in Texas
1925 sculptures
Bronze sculptures in Texas
Equestrian statues in Texas
Monuments and memorials in Texas
Outdoor sculptures in Austin, Texas
Sculptures of men in Texas